The flag and the coat of arms of Negeri Sembilan are state symbols of Negeri Sembilan, Malaysia. The symbols are predominantly depicted in red, black and yellow, traditional colours of the Minangkabau people who are the original settlers in the present-day state (see: the Marawa Minangkabau). Also recognised in the symbols are the political history of Negeri Sembilan, its ruler, and the state's past relationship with the British Empire.

Flag 

Adopted in 1895, the flag of Negeri Sembilan consists of a yellow flag with a canton on the upper hoist, which is divided diagonally from the corner of the upper hoist towards the corner of the lower fly. The upper portion of the canton is coloured red, while the lower portion is coloured black, exactly like the flag of Papua New Guinea; it is also similar to the flag of anarcho-communism.

The symbolisation of the flag is primarily concentrated towards the association of its colours with the people of the state. The yellow represents the Yang di-Pertuan Besar of Negeri Sembilan, the red denotes the citizens of the state, and the black symbolises the four undangs (traditional chiefs).

As well as being the state flag of Negeri Sembilan, the flag is also in use by the Yang di-Pertuan Besar as the royal standard to date. Prior to 1942, the British Resident of Negeri Sembilan was also assigned the same flag, with the exception it is forked at the fly.

Customary flags
Certain chiefdoms, or luaks, in Negeri Sembilan have their own flag for ceremonial uses during Adat Perpatih events. They are hardly seen in daily government administrative functions.

Local flags

Coat of arms 
 
The Negeri Sembilan coat of arms and state emblem is based on Western heraldry, but consists of only two heraldic elements: The shield (escutcheon) and crest or helm; the motto of the Negeri Sembilan arms, normally included on the bottom as a scroll on the majority of Malaysia's coats of arms, is embedded into the shield of the arms. Like the flag, the Negeri Sembilan coat of arms utilises the colours black, red and yellow with the minor addition of white.

Escutcheon
The escutcheon of the arms is depicted as an Old French shield outlined in black and white. The shield itself is coloured in shades of the Minangkabau people's traditional colours, like the flag, but is illustrated in the form of three partitions separated by diagonal lines running from the upper left to the lower right and varies slightly by its symbolisation. The colours signify the following:
 the yellow as the Yang Di-Pertuan Besar of Negeri Sembilan;
 the black as the four Undangs (with the addition of the Tunku Besar of Tampin); and
 the red as past relations with the British.
Further adorning the shield are nine yellow stalks of rice attached to the motto in the form a white scroll with "Negeri Sembilan" written in Jawi scripture (نڬري سمبيلن), with a nine-pointed star below. The stalks signifies the nine states under the old Negeri Sembilan: Jelai, Jelebu, Johol, Kelang (now part of Selangor), Naning (now part of Malacca), Rembau, Segamat-Pasir Besar, Sungei Ujong, and Ulu Pahang. Similarly, the nine-pointed star symbolise the nine (original) states of Negeri Sembilan united as one.

Crest or helm
The shield is topped by a crest or helm in the form of a white staff known as the Changgai Putri (or Changgai Puteri), which is fronted by a red sword and red scabbard. The staff represents the Yang Di-Pertuan Besar, while the sword and scabbard signify justice. Additionally, the staff and sword represent the Yang di-Pertuan Besar's personal Sceptre of Regalia since 1948.

City, district and municipal coat of arms

References 

Negeri Sembilan
Negeri Sembilan
Negeri Sembilan
Negeri Sembilan
Negeri Sembilan
Negeri Sembilan
Negeri Sembilan